The Kerinchi Pylon is a lattice-steel transmission tower located near Menara Telekom in Kerinchi, Kuala Lumpur, Malaysia.

It was built by Tenaga Nasional Berhad (TNB) in the middle of 1999. At , the pylon is recorded in the Malaysian Book of Records as the tallest electricity pylon in Southeast Asia.

The Kerinchi Pylon differs from other electricity pylons of comparable height, like those of Elbe Crossing 2, because is it not used for a powerline crossing of a wide waterway and that it is just a single structure.

It is the tallest strainer pylon in the world, all taller pylons are suspension pylons of long-distance spans.

Notes

Towers completed in 1999
Towers in Malaysia
Pylons
Buildings and structures in Kuala Lumpur
1999 establishments in Malaysia